Vittorio Avondo (August 10, 1836 – December 14, 1910) was an Italian antiquarian and painter born in Turin, where he served as a member of the city council. In his painting, he depicted mainly landscapes from his native Piedmont. He is considered one of the painters of the School of Rivara, which included Carlo Pittara.

Biography
Son of a docent at the college of Law at the University of Turin, he trained in painting in Tuscany, Switzerland and France. In Switzerland, he studied under Alexandre Calame. He worked briefly for a commission associated with the Bargello in Florence.

Returning to Turin in 1861, he became a city councillor. In 1883, he was appointed to the commission responsible for selecting works for the Civic Museum. In 1872, he bought the Issogne Castle in Valle d’Aosta. With the help of Alfredo d'Andrade, Giuseppe Giacose, and Ernesto Pochintesta, he restored the castle. In 1882, he helped restore the medieval neighborhood in Turin. He also worked to help restore Emanuele Tapparelli d’Azeglio's Casa Cavassa in Saluzzo. In 1890 he replaced Tapparelli d’Azeglio as director of the Museo Civico. Avondo died in Turin in 1910.

References

External links

1836 births
1910 deaths
19th-century Italian painters
Italian male painters
20th-century Italian painters
Italian antiquarians
Italian landscape painters
Painters from Turin
19th-century Italian male artists
20th-century Italian male artists